The National Symphony Orchestra (NSO) is an American symphony orchestra based in Washington, D.C.  Founded in 1930 by cellist Hans Kindler, its principal performing venue is the John F. Kennedy Center for the Performing Arts. It also performs for the annual National Memorial Day Concert and A Capitol Fourth celebrations. The NSO provides an education program that aims to expose its audiences to classical music. They also provide teaching resources to families and teachers. The NSO's educational programs include scholarships programs and opportunities for musically talented high school students who want to pursue a career in orchestral music.

History

First period: 1930-1949 
For the first period of its history, the NSO performed in Constitution Hall. Hans Kindler was a Dutch-born American cellist that founded the NSO in 1931. Their first concert in Washington, D.C. was performed by unemployed musicians.  During the tenure of the first music director, Hans Kindler, the musicians received a salary of $40.00 per week, for three rehearsals and one concert, for five months of the year. The first female member of the NSO was a harpist, Sylvia Meyer, who joined in 1933. She was considered a pioneer for female harpists due for the harp requiring patience and upkeep of the instrument.

1949-1996 
Kindler and the NSO made several 78-rpm recordings for RCA Victor, including the two Roumanian Rhapsodies by George Enescu; much later, in 1960, the NSO would perform the first of these works under the baton of the visiting Romanian conductor George Georgescu, a close associate and favored exponent of the composer. One of the more unusual RCA recordings with the orchestra was of the complete ballet music from the opera King Henry VIII by Camille Saint-Saëns, one of the very few recordings conducted by Walter Damrosch. Years later, Howard Mitchell made a series of stereophonic recordings with the orchestra for RCA. Antal Doráti recorded with the orchestra for Decca Records. Mstislav Rostropovich made recordings for Teldec, Sony Records, and Erato. Antal Doráti was a Hungarian-born music director with a reputation following him. He did multiple series of recordings with the Minneapolis Symphony as well as his years of experience with the BBC and the Stockholm orchestras. He was appointed NSO music director in 1970, but he only served his tenure for 7 years due to his deteriorating relationship with the NSO board of directors. After the board declined another of Doráti's projects, he would often vent his frustrations out to the orchestra in a subtle manner. After seven years with the NSO, he was appointed as music director for the Detroit Symphony in 1977. The orchestra returned to RCA Victor under Leonard Slatkin, until RCA abandoned new classical recordings.

1996–2008 
In 1986, the NSO became the artistic affiliate of the Kennedy Center, where it has presented a concert season annually since the Center opened in 1971.

Leonard Slatkin was music director of the NSO from 1996 to 2008.  One report spoke of tensions between the conductor and the orchestra, and mentioned criticisms of Slatkin's programming and rehearsal styles.  With the 2006–2007 season, Iván Fischer became the principal guest conductor of the orchestra.  On April 13, 2007, the orchestra announced the appointment of Fischer as the orchestra's principal conductor as of the 2008–2009 season, for two seasons.

2008-2022 
On September 25, 2008, the orchestra announced the appointment of Christoph Eschenbach as the orchestra's sixth music director, effective with the 2010–2011 season, for an initial contract of four years. During his tenure, NSO recorded a CD album. It was released on May 31, 2011, by the Finnish classical record label Ondine. The record included excerpts of their live performance from their program honoring the 50th anniversary of U.S. President John F. Kennedy's Inauguration. The recording was from their concert from January 22–24, 2011 which was held at Kennedy Center. In September 2011, the orchestra extended Eschenbach's contract through the 2014–2015 season, and in March 2014, his contract was extended through the 2016–2017 season. Throughout the 2016-2017 season, Eschenbach conducted a tribute program honoring the former music director Mstislav Rostropovich. He served as the maestro of NSO for 17 years, his legacy was celebrated through the program titled "Salute to Slava." Eschenbach concluded his tenure as NSO music director at the end of the 2016–2017 season, and subsequently became the NSO's conductor laureate.

In 2011, Gianandrea Noseda first guest-conducted the NSO, and returned in November 2015 for an additional guest engagement.  In January 2016, the NSO announced the appointment Noseda as its next music director, effective with the 2017–2018 season. He served as music director-designate in the 2016–2017 season, and his initial contract as music director was for 4 seasons.  In September 2018, the NSO announced the extension of Noseda's contract through the 2024–2025 season.  In November 2019 he conducted the romantic tragedy opera of Richard Wagner's "Tristan und Isolde" for the White Light Festival in Lincoln Center.

2022 to date 
In June 2022, the NSO announced a further extension of Noseda's contract through the 2026–2027 season. In July 2022, NSO also announced they have founded their record label which will feature releases of their recorded live performances. In January 2023, the NSO announced the appointment of Jean Davidson as its next executive director, effective 1 April 2023. Noseda and Davidson are set to collaborate for NSO's European tour during the 2023-2024 season. The orchestra will perform in Germany, Italy, and Spain.

Music directors 
 Hans Kindler (1931–1949)
 Howard Mitchell (1949–1970)
 Antal Doráti (1970–1977)
 Mstislav Rostropovich (1977–1994)
 Leonard Slatkin (1996–2008)
 Iván Fischer (principal conductor; 2008–2010)
 Christoph Eschenbach (2010–2017)
 Gianandrea Noseda (2017–present)

Activities
The NSO regularly participates in events of national and international importance, including performances for ceremonial state affairs, presidential inaugurations and official holiday celebrations, including the annual National Memorial Day Concert in May and A Capitol Fourth concerts on July 4.

The NSO itself numbers 100 musicians, presenting a 52-week season of approximately 175 concerts each year. These include classical subscription series, pops concerts, and educational programs. In addition to these activities, small groups of NSO members develop education programs designed at age levels from pre-kindergarten through high school.

Also of note is the National Symphony Orchestra Summer Music Institute. For more than a decade, scholarships provided by the National Trustees of the National Symphony Orchestra have enabled top-level students from across the country and from many nations to come to the nation's capital for several weeks of study with NSO musicians. The Youth Fellowship Program is one of the major scholarship programs within the NSO that encourages and assists high school students who want to pursue an orchestral career. Once a student is accepted within the program, they are eligible for multiple benefits such as a private instructor from the NSO or the Washington National Opera Orchestra. Master classes and seminars as well as opportunities to perform in NSO concerts are also included. These participants, selected from a competitive pool of applicants, come from a variety of backgrounds, some currently enrolled in music conservatories such as Juilliard and others still completing high school.

Collectively, these ensembles present as many as 100 additional performances a year during the American Residencies and at the Kennedy Center.

Through the John and June Hechinger Commissioning Fund for New Orchestral Works, the NSO has commissioned more than 50 works, including cycles of fanfares and encores.  During his tenure, Slatkin founded the National Conducting Institute in 2000.

Another important project is the National Symphony Orchestra American Residencies for the John F. Kennedy Center for the Performing Arts. This venture encompasses sharing all elements of classical symphonic music with a specific region of the United States, exploring the diversity of musical influences, and giving the region a musical voice in the nation's center for the performing arts through exchanges, training programs, and commissions. Established in 1992, the project has taken the NSO to fifteen states.

During the COVID-19 pandemic, the orchestra was affected because of the temporary shutdown. Although, they participated in local community outreach in 2020 called “NSO in Your Neighborhood (IYN).” Through this program, NSO held performances mostly outdoors in front of frontline health workers.

References

Further reading 

 National Symphony Orchestra Association, W. D. C. . (1949). A short history of the National Symphony Orchestra. Washington : The Association.

External links
 
 National Symphony Orchestra History 
 National Symphony Orchestra Profile at the Washington Post

American orchestras
Musical groups from Washington, D.C.
Members of the Cultural Alliance of Greater Washington
Wikipedia requested audio of orchestras
Musical groups established in 1930
1930 establishments in Washington, D.C.
United States
Arts organizations established in 1930
Performing arts in Washington, D.C.
Symphony orchestras